Chhitauni is a nagar panchayat in Kushinagar district of Uttar Pradesh, India.

References

External links
 Satellite map of Chhitauni

Villages in Deoria district